Frederick William Luehring (1882 – February 1, 1981) was an American football, basketball, baseball, and swimming coach college athletics administrator. He served as the head football coach at Ripon College in Ripon, Wisconsin from 1906 to 1909, compiling a record of 20–3–1. Luehring was the head basketball coach at Ripon from 1906 to 1910 and at Princeton University from 1913 to 1920, amassing a career college basketball coaching mark of 125–61.

Luehring was credited with starting the swim team at the University of Nebraska in 1921 and later served as a committee member of the US Olympic Swimming team.

As a college athlete, Luehring excelled at North Central University and then at the University of Chicago under head coach Amos Alonzo Stagg.

In addition to his athletic pursuits Luehring also was an art collector. A selection of prints by Honore Daumier of people swimming were exhibited at Lehigh University Art Gallery in 1958 with the assistance of Head Curator Francis Quirk.

Luehring died at the age of 99, on February 1, 1981, at Taylor Hospital in Ridley Park, Pennsylvania.

Head coaching record

Football

References

External links
 

1880s births
1981 deaths
American football ends
American men's basketball players
Basketball coaches from Kansas
Basketball players from Kansas
Chicago Maroons football players
Chicago Maroons men's basketball players
Minnesota Golden Gophers athletic directors
Nebraska Cornhuskers athletic directors
Nebraska Cornhuskers swimming coaches
North Central Cardinals football players
Ripon Red Hawks athletic directors
Ripon Red Hawks football coaches
Ripon Red Hawks men's basketball coaches
Ripon Red Hawks baseball coaches
Princeton Tigers men's basketball coaches
Princeton Tigers athletic directors
People from Washington County, Kansas
Coaches of American football from Kansas
Players of American football from Kansas
Baseball coaches from Kansas